The Upper Lake McDonald Ranger Station in Glacier National Park was a formerly isolated site that became an administrative center with the opening of the Going-to-the-Sun Road. The National Park Service Rustic cabin was typical of the preferred style for western park structures of the period. The ranger station is similar to its counterparts at Belly River and  Sherburne, as well as the Polebridge Ranger Station residence.

The district includes the ranger station, a woodshed, boathouse, garage, cabin, fire cache and a pumphouse.

The boathouse burned in the Howe Ridge Fire of 2018 and only the foundation remains.  The ranger station itself and other buildings were saved.

References

Ranger stations in Glacier National Park (U.S.)
Park buildings and structures on the National Register of Historic Places in Montana
National Park Service rustic in Montana
Historic districts on the National Register of Historic Places in Montana
National Register of Historic Places in Flathead County, Montana
National Register of Historic Places in Glacier National Park
1924 establishments in Montana
Residential buildings completed in 1924
Log buildings and structures on the National Register of Historic Places in Montana